Colt GAA is a Gaelic football and hurling club in County Laois, Ireland.

The club is located in the parish of Raheen and amalgamates with Shanahoe and Clonad to play underage football and hurling. Since 2020 it now amalgamates with Shanahoe to play hurling in the Laois Premier Intermediate Hurling Championship. The club has never won the Laois Senior Hurling Championship but won the Laois Intermediate Hurling Championship four times in 1965, 1971, 1979 and 2008. The club won the division 2 league in 2012.

Colt has also won the Laois Junior Hurling Championship twice in 1959 and 1996. In 1996, a double was achieved as Colt also won the Laois Junior "C" Hurling Championship with their second team. The junior teams most recent success was in 2019 when Colt won the Division 5 hurling league.

Football since 2020 is the way Colt is now represented. In 1998, the club won the Laois Junior "B" Football Championship title for the first time ever. In 2004, the All-County Football League Division 4 title was also won. Since 2011 the club has played many county finals and has not won a title since 1998 in football.

The club grounds are called Pairc Sean Uí hUidhrín and club colours are blue and gold.

History
There was a club in the area before Colt called Raheen. This disbanded and later people got together to set up Colt GAA.

Achievements
 Laois Intermediate Hurling Championship (4) 1965, 1971, 1979, 2008
 Laois Intermediate Hurling League Winners (1) 2010
 Laois Senior B Hurling League Winners (1) 2013
 Laois Junior Hurling Championship (2) 1959, 1996
 Laois Junior C Hurling Championship (1) 1996
 Laois Junior C Hurling League Winners 2008, 2011
 Laois Junior B Football Championship (1) 1998
 All-County Football League Division 4 2004
 All-County Football League Division 5 1997

Notable players
 James Keyes, played for Laois and also for Ireland in the Shinty–Hurling International Series
 Chris Murray
 John Galvin
 Billy Donavan

References

Gaelic games clubs in County Laois
Hurling clubs in County Laois
Gaelic football clubs in County Laois